Putative pre-mRNA-splicing factor ATP-dependent RNA helicase DHX15 is an enzyme that in humans is encoded by the DHX15 gene.

The protein encoded by this gene is a putative ATP-dependent RNA helicase implicated in pre-mRNA splicing. It may have tumor suppressor activity.

References

Further reading

Tumor suppressor genes